Vitthal Sakharam Page was an Indian freedom fighter and politician who served as 5th Chairman of the Maharashtra Legislative Council from 11 July 1960 to 24 April 1978.

Biography 
He was born on 21 July 1910 in Satara district and he completed a Bachelor of Laws from Mumbai University.

On 16 March 1990, he passed away.

Honors 
 2011, The president of India, Pratibha Patil, and India Post released a commemorative stamp on him.
 2020: MP Sanjaykaka Patil, laid a statement in Indian parliament to honor him with Padma Award posthumously.

References 

Chairs of the Maharashtra Legislative Council
Indian independence activists
1910 births
1990 deaths
20th-century Indian politicians
University of Mumbai alumni
People from Satara district